1st Field Artillery Regiment may refer to:
1st Field Artillery Regiment (Belgium)
1st Field Artillery Regiment (Canada), officially the "1st (Halifax-Dartmouth) Field Artillery Regiment"
1st Field Artillery Regiment (United States)